My Holiday is the third album by American singer-songwriter Mindy Smith, released in 2007. This is Smith's first holiday (Christmas) record.

Track listing

"My Holiday" - 3:43 (Smith)
"The Christmas Song" - 3:48 (Mel Tormé, Bob Wells)
"Santa Will Find You" - 3:49 (Smith, Chely Wright)
"Follow the Shepherd Home" - 4:22 (Smith, Wright)
"What Are You Doing New Year's Eve?" - 3:51 (Frank Loesser)
"Away in a Manger" - 2:42 (arr. by Smith)
"I Know the Reason" - 4:19 (Smith, Thad Cockrell)
"Silver Bells" - 3:14 (Jay Livingston, Ray Evans)
"I'll Be Home for Christmas" - 3:34 (Buck Ram, Kim Gannon, and Walter Kent)
"It Really Is (A Wonderful Life)" - 3:38 (Wright)
"Come Around" - 4:16 (Smith)
"Chestnuts Roasting" - 0:19

Personnel
 Mindy Smith – vocals
 Chely Wright – harmony vocals on "Follow the Shepherd Home"
 Alison Krauss – harmony vocals on "Away in a Manger"
 Thad Cockrell – duet vocals on "I Know the Reason"
 Kenny Vaughan – electric guitar
 Bryan Sutton – acoustic guitar
 Michael Rhodes – bass
 Steve Cox – piano
 Eddie Bayers – drums
 Andrea Zonn – violin, viola
 Lex Price – mandola
 Steve Buckingham – tambourine
 Paul Franklin – steel
 Sam Levine – clarinet
 Eric Darken– vibes

Production
 Producer: Mindy Smith and Steve Buckingham
 Engineer: Neal Cappellino, Brandon Bell and Gary Paczosa
 Mixing: Gary Paczosa
 Design and Photography: Traci Goudie

Notes
Mindy also released a Christmas EP entitled "Snowed In" on October 29, 2013
on the Giant Leap/TVX label. This release contained original material and covers of Christmas classics.

Christmas albums by American artists
Mindy Smith albums
Vanguard Records albums
2007 Christmas albums
Country Christmas albums
Folk Christmas albums